German submarine U-1132 was a Type VIIC U-boat of Nazi Germany's Kriegsmarine during World War II.

She was ordered on 25 August 1941, and was laid down on 15 February 1943 at Howaldtswerke AG, Kiel, as yard number 34. She was launched on 29 April 1944 and commissioned under the command of Oberleutnant zur See Walter-Bruno Koch on 24 June 1944.

Design
German Type VIIC submarines were preceded by the shorter Type VIIB submarines. U-1132 had a displacement of  when at the surface and  while submerged. She had two shafts and two  propellers.

U-1132 was fitted with five  torpedo tubes (four fitted at the bow and one at the stern), fourteen torpedoes or 26 TMA mines, one  SK C/35 naval gun, (220 rounds), one  Flak M42 and two twin  C/30 anti-aircraft guns. The boat had a complement of between 44 — 52 men.

Service history
U-1132 was scuttled near Flensburg, in Kupfermühle Bay, on 5 May 1945, as part of Operation Regenbogen. Her wreck was raised and broken up.

References

Bibliography

External links

German Type VIIC submarines
U-boats commissioned in 1944
World War II submarines of Germany
Ships built in Kiel
1944 ships
Operation Regenbogen (U-boat)
Maritime incidents in May 1945